Alexander Rosser (19 November 1879 – 8 October 1949) was an Australian rules footballer who played with Essendon in the Victorian Football League (VFL).

Family
The son of William Rosser (1849-1920), and Janet Rosser (1853-1929), née Emond, Alexander Rosser was born at Geelong, Victoria on 19 November 1879.

He married Elizabeth "Bessie" Podger (1881-1944) in 1902.

Football
He played 8 senior games for the Essendon Football Club in 1903, and represented the VFL in a match against a combined Ballarat Football Association Team on 27 June 1903.

Military service
He enlisted in the First AIF on 11 December 1914. He served overseas, leaving Australia on HMAT  on 12 February 1915, and returned (to Melbourne) on HMAT  on 9 September 1915. He was discharged from the army on medical grounds on 1 December 1915.

Death
He died at the Repatriation General Hospital in Heidelberg, Victoria on 8 October 1949.

Notes

References
 First World War Nominal Roll: Private Alexander Rosser (1622), collection of the Australian War Memorial.
 First World War Embarkation Roll: Private Alexander Rosser (1622), collection of the Australian War Memorial.
 First World War Service Record: Private Alexander Rosser (1622), National Archives of Australia.
 Maplestone, M., Flying Higher: History of the Essendon Football Club 1872–1996, Essendon Football Club, (Melbourne), 1996.

External links 

1879 births
1949 deaths
Australian rules footballers from Victoria (Australia)
Essendon Football Club players
Newtown Football Club players